Building the Left–Socialist Alternative (CLI–AS), also known as Socialist Alternative (AS), is a left-wing political party in Spain. The party was founded in 2013 by members of the PSOE critical with the neoliberal positions of the party, along with independents and people from the 15-M Movement.

History
CLI–AS supported the Plural Left in the European Parliament election of 2014 and supports Popular Unity for the Spanish elections of 2015.

References

Federalist parties in Spain
Republican parties in Spain
Political parties established in 2013
Ecosocialist parties
Socialist parties in Spain
2013 establishments in Spain
Unidas Podemos